Wolf-Dietrich von Kurnatowski was a canon and priest of the Christian Community. He earned a Doctor of Law at the University of Greifswald. He was the author of the genealogy of the House of Kurnatowski.

Anthroposophists
Jurists of religious law
Clan of Łodzia
1908 births
1972 deaths
University of Greifswald alumni